Smin E Bya-Ye Zeik-Bye (also spelled Zeip Bye) was chief minister of Hanthawaddy in the 1380s in the service of kings Binnya U and Razadarit. He was a key figure responsible for Razadarit's ascent to power. Though he lost the chief ministership to Byat Za and Dein Mani-Yut in 1388, Zeik-Bye continued to serve as a senior minister at least until 1408.

Background
The Razadarit Ayedawbon chronicle includes two men who wore the title Smin Zeik-Bye in the service of King Binnya U (r. 1348–1384). The subject of this article is the man who became chief minister in the second half of the king's reign, not Gov. Smin Zeik-Bye of Dala–Twante, who died  1371.

The chronicle does not provide any direct information about the minister's background. It can be inferred from the language used in the chronicle that the minister was of the same generation as King Binnya U (b. 1323), and was likely related to the royal family.

Royal service of Binnya U

Chief minister
The first unambiguous mention of Zeik-Bye the chief minister in the Razadarit Ayedawbon chronicle is when he was already chief minister  1382/83. (According to Nai Pan Hla, he was governor of Taikkala and one of the most trusted senior officers of King Binnya U in the 1360s.) Nonetheless, his influence as chief minister was limited. Binnya U was in ill health, and the real power belonged to Princess Maha Dewi of Dagon. The king had relied on his elder sister for advice since the death of Chief Minister Pun-So in 1369. Zeik-Bye was not part of Maha Dewi's inner circle; she was closely allied with her nephew-in-law and alleged lover Smin Maru.

Aiding Binnya Nwe's rebellion
Zeik-Bye responded by quietly undermining her power. He plotted to put Prince Binnya Nwe, the king's eldest son and Maha Dewi's adopted son, on the throne, and marry his two young daughters to the prince. The prince had been deeply unhappy that his father had chosen another, younger, son to be the heir-apparent. In 1383, the minister persuaded the 15-year-old prince that Maha Dewi was planning to put her lover Maru on the throne, and that he would fully support a rebellion by Nwe.

The minister kept his end of the bargain. When Nwe fled to Dagon with 30 men to raise a rebellion in May 1383, Zeik-Bye stalled the princess and the court for the next five months, allowing Nwe to garner support amongst local governors around Dagon. When Maha Dewi finally ordered an expedition to Dagon in October, Zeik-Bye led the rearguard army, and undermined the attack. When Binnya U died in January 1384, he found enough support in the court to hand the power to Nwe. Nwe ascended the throne with the title of Razadarit.

Razadarit years

Chief minister
Zeik-Bye served the new king's chief minister for the next four years. He also became the new king's father-in-law as he gave his two daughters, Mi Kha-Dun-Mut and Mi Hpyun-Gyo, in marriage to the king. Nonetheless, his influence on the young king was never great. Even at the beginning, Razadarit knew that he needed more than the Zeik-Bye faction of the court, and did not punish the factions that did not support him during his rebellion. In the following years, the young king, who faced several internal and external threats, valued court ministers who could also take the field. Zeik-Bye, who was already in his 60s, did not go the front in any of the campaigns between 1385 and 1391 against the northern Ava Kingdom and the rebel forces of Martaban and Myaungmya. By 1388, two ministers Dein Mani-Yut and Byat Za, who had proved themselves as successful commanders, had overtaken Zeik-Bye as the chief advisers of the king.

Senior minister
Nonetheless, Zeik-Bye remained one of the four senior ministers. He was part of the embassy led by Byat Za and Dein to Siam to receive a white elephant for Razadarit presented by the king of Ayutthaya in the early 1390s. In 1401, when Razadarit invaded Ava, Zeik-Bye was entrusted to govern the capital Pegu in the king's absence. Furthermore, although he had not gone to the front since 1383, he remained part of the Pegu high command. In 1402, he supported the king's position to maintain the siege of Prome (Pyay) while the king's co-chief ministers Byat Za and Dein recommended an immediate withdrawal. Zeik-Bye, who was at least 79, took command of the garrison at Nawin, south of Prome. But it was a complete disaster. Larger Ava forces not only broke the siege but also sacked Nawin. All three regiments defending the garrison were lost; Zeik-Bye himself was captured.

Zeik-Bye was returned to Pegu after Ava and Pegu signed a peace treaty in 1403. He received a new title, Smin E Bya-Ye but his influence had greatly diminished. The Razadarit Ayedawbon includes an episode in which the king made him contribute to the war effort financially. In 1408, Razadarit told the minister, who held the town of Sittaung in fief, that unless he "lent" funds to the royal coffers, the royal army would not defend the town. His only other choice was to defend the town on his own. After protesting that he was too old to fight, the minister "lent" 7 viss (11.43 kg) of gold to the king, and 1 viss (1.63 kg) of gold to the army. At least to that year, he remained part of the Pegu high command.

Chronicles do not say when he died but he was most likely dead by 1415. That year, Razadarit appointed Dein governor of Sittaung, Zeik-Bye's fief.

List of campaigns
The following is a list of Zeik-Bye's military campaigns. Although he was part of the high command at least until 1408, chronicles report that he went to the front only twice between 1383 and 1408.

Notes

References

Bibliography
 
 
 
 
 
 

Government ministers of Myanmar
15th-century deaths
14th-century births